Eupithecia velutipennis is a moth in the family Geometridae first described by Claude Herbulot in 1986. It is found in Guadeloupe, Marie-Galante, Martinique and Montserrat.

References

Moths described in 1986
velutipennis
Moths of the Caribbean